"Who You'd Be Today" is a song written by Aimee Mayo and Bill Luther and recorded by American country music singer Kenny Chesney.  It was released in September 2005 as the first single from Chesney's 2005 album The Road and the Radio.  It was also Chesney's highest-debuting single at the time, having entered the U.S. Billboard Hot Country Songs chart at number 26. This record has since been broken by "Don't Blink", which debuted at number 16 two years later.

Despite reaching number 2 on the U.S. Billboard Hot Country Songs chart, this song is not included on Chesney's 2009 compilation album Greatest Hits II.

Content
"Who You'd Be Today" is a song to a person who died before their time ("It ain't fair, you died too young / Like a story that had just begun / But death tore the pages all away"). The narrator describes how much he has missed that person and questions what their life would be like if they were still alive ("Sometimes, I wonder who you'd be today"). The song ends with the narrator saying that the only hope that comes from the death is knowing they'll see each other again someday.

Music video
The music video was directed by Shaun Silva and premiered on CMT on September 27, 2005. It starts off with two teenage boys in a basketball practice, and then cuts to Chesney's performance, and subjects related to the song's storyline. Throughout the video, friends and couples are seen speaking to each other. A high-school couple is seen talking together, and flashbacks are seen, implying that the woman was killed in a car crash. A woman is sitting on a bench, talking to a man, later scenes show the woman pulled from a burning building, and imply the man died in the fire. The boys playing basketball are also seen playing at the same court as kids, then cutting to serving in the military. As the boys run up the basketball court, one of them disappears, revealing the other one to be playing alone and reflecting on the past with his friend.

Chart performance
The song debuted at number 26 on the U.S. Billboard Hot Country Songs for the week ending October 1, 2005.

Year-end charts

Certifications

References

2005 singles
Country ballads
2000s ballads
Kenny Chesney songs
Songs written by Aimee Mayo
Music videos directed by Shaun Silva
Song recordings produced by Buddy Cannon
BNA Records singles
2005 songs
Songs written by Bill Luther (songwriter)